Arbatan in Iran may refer to:
 Arbatan, Heris (اربطان)
 Arbatan, Marand (ارباتان)